The U.S. state of Minnesota first required its residents to register their motor vehicles in 1903. Registrants provided their own license plates for display until 1909, when the state began to issue plates.

, plates are issued by the Minnesota Department of Public Safety through its Driver and Vehicle Services Division. Front and rear plates are required for most classes of vehicles, while only rear plates are required for motorcycles and trailers.

Passenger baseplates

1909 to 1954

1955 to present
The 1954 (dated 1955) issue was the first Minnesota license plate that complied with these standards.

Since 1989, Minnesota law has required license plates to be replaced every seven years, due to deterioration of the reflective material.

Optional plates

Non-passenger plates

References

External links
Minnesota license plates, 1969–present

Minnesota
Transportation in Minnesota
1909 in transport
Minnesota transportation-related lists